XHCHM-FM was a noncommercial radio station on 97.7 FM in Ciudad Hidalgo, Michoacán. It is owned by Medios Radiofónicos Michoacán through permitholder Blanca Estela Castañeda Terán and carries its Clasics format, which was carried on MRM's three permit stations in the state.

XHCHM received its permit on April 30, 2013. MRM turned in the social concession and that of XHPAT-FM Pátzcuaro on January 8, 2020, citing the state of the regional economy.

References

Radio stations in Michoacán
2013 establishments in Mexico
2020 disestablishments in Mexico
Defunct radio stations in Mexico
Radio stations established in 2013
Radio stations disestablished in 2020